Thees Uhlmann is the eponymous debut record for former Tomte frontman Thees Uhlmann released through Uhlmann's own Grand Hotel van Cleef label on August 26, 2011. The record was commercially well-received, charting within the Top 5 in Germany and the Top 20 in Austria. The album did not chart in Switzerland. The album consists mostly of sentimental narratives composed on an acoustic guitar. The music was influenced by American rock-singer Bruce Springsteen. German rapper Casper features on & Jay-Z singt uns ein Lied and received credit for writing his own verse. Otherwise, all lyrics, which were written by Uhlmann, describe a search for stability and a place to call home. After the album's release, Uhlmann, a native of Hemmoor, left Berlin and moved back to a more rural environment. This frustration is highlighted throughout the record.

Track listing

Formats
 Standard Edition on CD and vinyl
 Special Edition
 Fan Edition

Chart history

References

2011 debut albums
Thees Uhlmann albums